John Richard Boyd (January 23, 1927 – March 9, 1997) was a United States Air Force fighter pilot and Pentagon consultant during the second half of the 20th century. His theories have been highly influential in military, business, and litigation strategies and planning.

As part of the Fighter Mafia, Boyd inspired the Lightweight Fighter program (LWF), which produced the General Dynamics F-16 Fighting Falcon and preceded McDonnell Douglas F/A-18 Hornet. Boyd, together with Thomas Christie, created the Energy–Maneuverability theory of aerial combat, which became the world standard for the design of fighter aircraft. He also developed the decision cycle known as the OODA loop, the process by which an entity reacts to an event.

Early life
Boyd was born on January 23, 1927, in Erie, Pennsylvania. He enlisted in the Army Air Forces on October 30, 1944, while he was still a junior in high school. After graduation, he completed his basic training and skill training as an aircraft turret mechanic during the waning months of World War II. From January 1946 to January 1947, Boyd served as a swimming instructor in Japan. He attained the rank of sergeant, and served in the Air Force Reserve until he graduated from college. He graduated from the University of Iowa in 1951 with a bachelor's degree in economics and later earned a second bachelor's degree in industrial engineering from the Georgia Institute of Technology.

Air Force career
Boyd was commissioned as a second lieutenant in the Air Force following completion of the ROTC program at the University of Iowa. On March 27, 1953, Boyd arrived in Korea as an F-86 pilot. In the two months until the armistice on July 27, Boyd flew a short tour (22 missions instead of 100) in F-86 Sabres during the Korean War during which he served as a wingman and never fired his guns or claimed an aerial kill. After his service in Korea, he was invited to attend the Fighter Weapons School (FWS). Boyd attended the school and graduated at the top of his class. Upon graduation, he was invited to stay at the FWS as an instructor. He became head of the Academic Section and wrote the tactics manual for the school.

Boyd was brought to the Pentagon by Major General Arthur C. Agan Jr. to do mathematical analysis that would support the McDonnell Douglas F-15 Eagle program in order to pass the Office of the Secretary of Defense's Systems Analysis process. 

He was dubbed "Forty Second Boyd" for his standing bet as an instructor pilot that beginning from a position of disadvantage, he could defeat any opposing pilot in air combat maneuvering in less than 40 seconds. According to his biographer, Robert Coram, Boyd was also known at different points of his career as "The Mad Major" for the intensity of his passions, as "Genghis John" for his confrontational style of interpersonal discussion, and as the "Ghetto Colonel" for his spartan lifestyle.

During the Vietnam War, he served as Vice Commander of Task Force Alpha and as Commander of the 56th Combat Support Group at Nakhon Phanom Royal Thai Air Force Base in Thailand from April 1972 to April 1973.

Military theories
In the early 1960s, Boyd, together with Thomas Christie, a civilian mathematician, created the energy–maneuverability theory, or E-M theory, of aerial combat. A legendary maverick by reputation, Boyd was said to have stolen the computer time to do the millions of calculations necessary to prove the theory, but a later audit found that all of computer time at the facility has been properly billed to recognized projects and that no irregularity could be prosecuted. E-M theory became the world standard for the design of fighter aircraft. The Air Force's FX project (subsequently the F-15) was then floundering, but Boyd's deployment orders to Vietnam were canceled, and he was brought to the Pentagon to redo the tradeoff studies according to E-M theory. His work helped save the project from being a costly dud even though its final product was larger and heavier than he had desired.

With Colonel Everest Riccioni and Pierre Sprey, Boyd formed a small advocacy group within Headquarters USAF that dubbed itself the "Fighter Mafia." Riccioni was an Air Force fighter pilot assigned to a staff position in Research and Development, and Sprey was a civilian statistician working in systems analysis. While assigned to working on the beginnings of the F-15, then called the Blue Bird, Boyd disagreed with the direction the program was going and proposed an alternative "Red Bird". The concept was for a clear-weather air-to-air-only fighter with a top speed of Mach 1.6, rather than the Blue Bird's Mach 2.5+. The top speed would be sacrificed for lower weight (and therefore better maneuverability and lower cost). Both Boyd and Sprey also argued against an active radar and radar-guided missiles, and they proposed the concept to Air Staff. The proposal went unheeded, and there were no changes to the Blue Bird.

The Secretary of Defense, attracted by the idea of a low cost fighter, gave funding to Riccioni for a study project on the Lightweight Fighter program (LWF), which became the F-16. Both the Department of Defense and the Air Force went ahead with the program and stipulated a "design to cost" basis no more than $3 million per copy over 300 aircraft. The USAF considered the idea of a "hi-lo" mix force structure and expanded the LWF program. The program soon went against the Fighter Mafia's vision since it was not the stripped-down air-to-air specialist that they had envisioned but a heavier multi-role fighter-bomber with advanced avionics, an active radar, and radar-guided missiles.

Harry Hillaker, an F-16 designer, remarked that he would have designed the plane differently if he had known that it would become a multi mission aircraft.

Boyd is credited for largely developing the strategy for the invasion of Iraq in the Gulf War of 1991. In 1981, Boyd had presented his briefing, Patterns of Conflict, to US Representative Richard "Dick" Cheney. By 1990, Boyd had moved to Florida because of declining health, but Cheney, now Defense Secretary in the George H. W. Bush administration, called Boyd back to work on the plans for Operation Desert Storm. Boyd had substantial influence on the ultimate "left hook" design of the plan.

In a letter to the editor of Inside the Pentagon, the former Commandant of the Marine Corps General Charles C. Krulak is quoted as saying, "The Iraqi army collapsed morally and intellectually under the onslaught of American and Coalition forces. John Boyd was an architect of that victory as surely as if he'd commanded a fighter wing or a maneuver division in the desert."

OODA loop

Boyd's key concept was that of the decision cycle or OODA loop, the process by which an entity (either an individual or an organization) reacts to an event.The OODA Loop has since been used as the core for a theory of litigation strategy that unifies the use of cognitive science and game theory to shape the actions of witnesses and opposing counsel. It has also been proposed as a tool for work-based learning and management education.

Aerial Attack Study
Boyd also served to revolutionize air-to-air combat in that he was the author of the Aerial Attack Study, which became the official tactics manual for fighter aircraft. Boyd changed how pilots thought; prior to his tactics manual, pilots had thought that air-to-air combat was far too complex to ever be fully understood. With the release of the Aerial Attack Study, pilots realized that the high-stakes death dance of aerial combat was solved. Boyd said that a pilot going into aerial combat must know two things: the position of the enemy and the velocity of the enemy. Given the velocity of an enemy, a pilot can decide what the enemy can do. When a pilot knows what maneuvers the enemy can perform, he can then decide how to counter any of the other pilot's actions.

Military reform
Boyd gave testimony to Congress about the status of military reform after Operation Desert Storm.

Maneuver warfare and Marines
In January 1980 Boyd gave his briefing Patterns of Conflict at the US Marines AWS (Amphibious Warfare School), which led to the instructor, Michael Wyly, and Boyd changing the curriculum. That was with the blessing of General Trainor, who later asked Wyly to write a new tactics manual for the Marines.

Wyly, along with Pierre Sprey, Raymond J. "Ray" Leopold, Franklin "Chuck" Spinney, Jim Burton, and Tom Christie, were described by writer Coram as Boyd's "acolytes".

Later career 
At his retirement in 1975, Boyd was awarded the prestigious Harold Brown Award by the US Air Force.

Death
Boyd died of cancer in Florida on March 9, 1997, at age 70. He was buried with full military honors at Arlington National Cemetery on March 20, 1997. His burial site is Section 60, Gravesite 3066.

Awards and decorations
During his lengthy career, Boyd earned many decorations, including:

References

Notes

Bibliography

 
 
 
 . Contains "Destruction and Creation".
  Uses the OODA Loop as a core construct for a litigation strategy system unifying psychology, systems theory, game theory and other concepts from military science.
 .
  An explanation of Boyd's ideas.
  
  Based on John Boyd's theories.
 
 
  Aims to provide a better understanding of Boyd's ideas concerning conflict and military strategy. Contains a full description and explanation of all of his presentations. Takes reader beyond rapid OODA loop idea and demonstrates direct influence on development of Network Centric Warfare and Fourth Generation Warfare. Argues Boyd is first postmodern strategist.
 .
 Robinson, Stephen. The Blind Strategist: John Boyd and the American Art of War (2021) excerpt

External links

 
 .
 .
 .
 .
 
 .
 .
 

1927 births
1997 deaths
20th-century American writers
American Korean War pilots
American military writers
Burials at Arlington National Cemetery
Deaths from cancer in Florida
Georgia Tech alumni
Military personnel from Pennsylvania
Military strategists
Military theorists
Recipients of the Air Medal
Recipients of the Legion of Merit
United States Air Force officers
United States Air Force personnel of the Korean War
United States Air Force personnel of the Vietnam War
United States Army Air Forces non-commissioned officers
United States Army Air Forces personnel of World War II
Writers from Erie, Pennsylvania